Tomáš Prokop (30 January 1994 – 19 September 2021) was a Czech professional ice hockey player. He played for Hokej Šumperk 2003 of the Czech 1.liga.

Prokop made his Czech Extraliga debut playing with Motor České Budějovice during the 2012-13 Czech Extraliga season. He retired in 2018, and died at the age of 27 on 19 September 2021.

Career statistics

Regular season and playoffs

References

External links

1994 births
2021 deaths
Motor České Budějovice players
Stadion Hradec Králové players
Hokej Šumperk 2003 players
IHC Písek players
BK Havlíčkův Brod players
MsHK Žilina players
Hockey Club de Cergy-Pontoise players
Czech ice hockey defencemen
Sportspeople from České Budějovice
Expatriate ice hockey players in France
Czech expatriate sportspeople in France
Czech expatriate ice hockey players in Slovakia